The 2003 Oregon Ducks football team represented the University of Oregon during the 2003 NCAA Division I-A football season.

Before the season

Recruiting

Schedule

Game summaries

Mississippi State

Source: ESPN

Nevada

Arizona

Michigan

Source: 
    
    
    
    
    
    
    
    
    

Highest ranked non-conference opponent Oregon defeated at home

Washington State

Utah

Arizona State

Stanford

Washington

California

UCLA

Oregon State

Sun Bowl (Minnesota)

References

Oregon
Oregon Ducks football seasons
Oregon Ducks football